= Fedio =

Fedio فديو
- Village
- Location in Syria
- Coordinates: 35°31′3″N 35°53′35″E
- Country: Syria
- Governorate: Latakia Governorate

Population (2004)
  - Total: 4,065
- Time zone: UTC+2 (EET)
  - Summer (DST): UTC+3 ( EEST)
- City Qrya Pcode: C3568

Fedio (also spelled Fedyo; Arabic: فديو) is a Syrian village located in Latakia Governorate. Fedio had a population of 4,065 in the 2004 census.
